The Europe Zone was one of the two regional zones of the 1952 Davis Cup.

23 teams entered the Europe Zone, with the winner going on to compete in the Inter-Zonal Zone against the winners of the America Zone and Eastern Zone. Italy defeated Belgium in the final and progressed to the Inter-Zonal Zone.

Draw

First round

Monaco vs. Ireland

Luxembourg vs. Egypt

Finland vs. Yugoslavia

Norway vs. France

Turkey vs. Switzerland

Austria vs. Chile

Second round

West Germany vs. Brazil

Monaco vs. Denmark

Italy vs. Egypt

Yugoslavia vs. Great Britain

France vs. Netherlands

Switzerland vs. Argentina

Sweden vs. Chile

Belgium vs. Hungary

Quarterfinals

Denmark vs. West Germany

Italy vs. Great Britain

France vs. Argentina

Belgium vs. Sweden

Semifinals

Italy vs. Denmark

France vs. Belgium

Final

Italy vs. Belgium

References

External links
Davis Cup official website

Davis Cup Europe/Africa Zone
Europe Zone
Davis Cup